USS Doris B. IV (SP-625) was a United States Navy patrol vessel in commission from 1917 to 1919.

Doris B. IV was built as a private motorboat of the same name by Britt Brothers at Lynn, Massachusetts, in 1917. In April 1917, the U.S. Navy acquired her for use as a section patrol boat during World War I. She was commissioned as USS Doris B. IV (SP-625) on 12 May 1917.

Assigned to the 1st Naval District in northern New England, Doris B. IV performed patrol duty for the rest of World War I.

Doris B. IV was decommissioned at Boston, Massachusetts, on 31 January 1919 and transferred to the United States Department of the Treasury on 21 November 1919.

References

Department of the Navy Naval History and Heritage Command Online Library of Selected Images: U.S. Navy Ships: USS Doris B. IV (SP-625), 1917-1919.
NavSource Online: Section Patrol Craft Photo Archive Doris B. IV (SP 625)

Patrol vessels of the United States Navy
World War I patrol vessels of the United States
Ships built in Lynn, Massachusetts
1917 ships